Fanhams Hall is an 18th-century Queen Anne House-style country house in Wareside, Hertfordshire in the south east of England. It is a Grade II* listed building which is now operating as a hotel.

Built in the early 18th century, it was subsequently enlarged in 1901, when the original brick building was encased and extended as a three-storey Jacobean style country house, roughcast with stone dressings. On the north is a projecting hall range with a long gallery above. The east front has eight bays with a three-storey central porch. The west front has three bays and the courtyard front 15 bays, with a round arch entrance flanked by two two-storey towers with pyramidal roofs.

The interior is decorated in the Arts and Crafts style with plasterwork by L A Turner and stained glass by Morris and Co. in the library.

History

Fanhams Hall is noteworthy for being the birthplace and home of the first Lord Croft, Sir Henry Page-Croft, who was the youngest son of Richard Benyon Croft (benefactor of Richard Hale School) and who was Winston Churchill's appointed Under-Secretary of State for War until 1945. The south-east wing of the house served as his living quarters, and the present-day bedrooms numbered 207-210 were Lord Croft's maisonette. In 1874, Fanhams Hall was also the birthplace and home of his sister, Anne, who later became the second wife of Liverpool Brewer Sir Charles Nall-Cain; they lived at Brocket Hall, Welwyn until Lord Brocket's death in 1934, when Lady Brocket returned to Fanhams Hall where she resided until her death in 1949.

Earlier Joseph Farington RA visited his friends, Mr and Mrs Offley, at the hall.  In 1828-33 it was rented by the first cousin of J.M.W.Turner RA, Charlotte Harpur, and her husband Dr Richard Jordan MD.

The house was sold as a training centre to the Westminster Bank in 1951, to the Chartered Building Societies Institute in 1971, and to J Sainsbury plc in February 1986.

Garden
Lady Brocket's interest in horticulture influenced the employment of Japanese gardeners to create the Hall's formal gardens.  Her ornamental lakes and choice of trees (such as Japanese maples) can still be seen in the present-day formal grounds, as can the "Fuji-yama Mound" which was built with earth from the Hall's lakes.

The garden is listed grade II on the Register of Historic Parks and Gardens.

Current use

The Hall currently serves as a hotel and events venue, and is owned by the hotel group Exclusive Hotels and Venues. The Hall is still open to the public as a local meeting point. For example, the local branch of the Ancient Order of Foresters holds meetings within the grounds, and its buildings are also a location for political fundraising events within the town.

Location
Fanhams Hall is located in Ware, Hertfordshire.

References

External links

Country houses in Hertfordshire
Hotels in Hertfordshire
Grade II* listed buildings in Hertfordshire
Grade II listed parks and gardens in Hertfordshire
Japanese gardens in England
Country house hotels
Wareside